Denny Walter Felsner (born April 29, 1970) is an American former professional ice hockey winger.

Biography
Felsner was born in Warren, Michigan. As a youth, he played in the 1982 Quebec International Pee-Wee Hockey Tournament with a minor ice hockey team from Detroit. He is the brother of hockey player, Brian Felsner.

Playing career
He played college hockey for the Michigan Wolverines. After turning professional, he played for the St. Louis Blues in the NHL; the Peoria Rivermen, Chicago Wolves, Milwaukee Admirals, and the Detroit Vipers of the IHL; the Syracuse Crunch of the AHL; and the Chesapeake Icebreakers and Jackson Bandits of the ECHL. Dennis is a graduate of Warren Woods Tower High.

Career statistics

Awards and honors

References

External links

1970 births
Living people
American men's ice hockey right wingers
Chesapeake Icebreakers players
Chicago Wolves players
Detroit Vipers players
Ice hockey players from Michigan
Jackson Bandits players
Michigan Wolverines men's ice hockey players
Milwaukee Admirals players
Sportspeople from Warren, Michigan
Peoria Rivermen (IHL) players
Syracuse Crunch players
St. Louis Blues draft picks
St. Louis Blues players
AHCA Division I men's ice hockey All-Americans